Quanzhou Jinjiang International Airport  is a dual-use military and public airport serving the city of Quanzhou in Fujian, China. It is located 12 kilometers south of the city center, in the county-level city of Jinjiang, which is under the administration of the prefecture-level city of Quanzhou.

Airlines and destinations

Quanzhou Airport is served by the following airlines:

See also
List of airports in China
List of the busiest airports in China
List of People's Liberation Army Air Force airbases

References

Airports in Fujian
Chinese Air Force bases
Quanzhou
Jinjiang, Fujian
Airports established in 1955